Chakravarthy Chandrachud (DJ) is a revolutionary journalist, well known poet, progressive thinker, social activist, actor, writer, director and debater from Karnataka.
 Personal Background and Education:
Chakravarthy Chandrachud was born on 15 August, 1977 in Devanoor, a village in Karnataka’s Chickmangalur District. Hailing from a traditional, farming family, he went on to do his engineering in Instrumental Technology from Jaya Chamarajendra College in Mysore. He also completed his post graduation in Psychology and History at the University of Mysore. He then went on to earn his M.Phil. from Kuppam.

As a journalist

Chakravarthy Chandrachud began his journey as journalist when he was still a college student. He has extensive experience of nearly 21 years, having worked with some of the well known names in the field including Janamitra, a local newspaper in Hassan and Mysore’s well known daily, Andolana. Hai Bangalore, Agni, Lankesh Patrike (where he also worked in the capacity of an editor) are some of the popular weeklies that he has been associated with. He has won state awards for several of his investigative and environmental pieces. He has earned recognition by creating his own brand of journalism and has been instrumental in revolutionizing journalism in the state. 

As an activist

Chakravarthy Chandrachud actively involved himself in social activism, right from his childhood days, by associating with organizations like SFI and DFI for their national level work. He is a forerunner for the ‘Hasiru Sene’, a wing of the state’s Farmers Union and for any pro-Kannada activism. 
He is also the founder of the organization ‘People for People’ which was formed  to fight for the Kalasa Banduri Movement. He built his own army which worked tirelessly on providing relief for those affected in the flood hit areas of Karnataka, Tamil Nadu and Orissa. He has been associated with several irrigational reform movements in the state, for which he has even been jailed and has been part of legal activism in this regard.

As a debater and social thinker

Chakravarthy Chandrachud is a regular face for Kannada TV debates and news panel discussions. He has earned a niche for himself as a social activist who speaks fearlessly about several decisive and path breaking issues of social relevance. He is known as someone who is always ready to associate himself with any protests or struggles that are connected to and impact Karnataka.

 As a Documentary Film Maker and Director

Chakravarthy Chandrachud directed and produced the documentary ‘Mahamarana’ which deals with the Mahadayi Project. This documentary, disclosing the scientific facts behind the Kalasa Banduri Dispute, was well received. He also made the movie ‘Janma Bhoo Veera’ which dealt with the land slides in Coorg. 

Books and Awards

Chakravarthy Chandrachud’s first book, ’Jana Jala Kranti’ is a comprehensive study on the revolutionary and impactful works of Anna Hazare and Rajendra Singh, in the field of Irrigational Reforms. A lot of research, particularly in Rajasthan and Maharastra, went into constructing this piece of work and earned it the National Environmental Award. ‘Khaali Shilube’ (The Empty Cross), which was innovatively released at a crematorium in Chamrajpet, Bangalore, created a lot of waves in the state. ‘Mailu Tutta’ which was released at Malleshwaram’s Dhobhi Ghat, garnered a lot of popularity. Each of these books have been translated into several languages and have been honored with many awards and recognitions. ‘Katha Bharata’ is his fourth book which is a story narrative of how India evolved and developed, influenced by its several revolutions. 

As an Actor, Writer, Director

Chakravarthy Chandrachud has also established himself as a composer, writer, director. He has worked in the Kannada, Tamil and Malayalam film industries. He has directed and written Janma- a movie that is set against the backdrop of the Kaveri issue and attempts at very realistically potraying the chaos that ensued the death of Kannada matinee idol Dr.Rajkumar. The movie won critical acclaim and both the Kannada and Tamil versions have been directed by him. As a writer, he has worked on movies like  Melobba Mayavi, Janma, Mahuta, Paadaraya, Love you Alia. As an actor he has worked in Janma, Melobba Mayavi, Demo Piece, Ranganayaki, Football Mariyammana (Malayalam), Kalidasa Kannada Meshtru, 1975, Madhyantara and DSS. He has acted in  many upcoming Hindi web series. His entry into Big Boss Season 8 as a wild card entry was sensational and much talked about. It earned him a reputation of a no-nonsense person who is not afraid to speak his mind.

Currently, Chakravarthy Chandrachud  is busy with his latest venture- Akhada Media and Entertainment, of which he is the Chief Editor and CEO. He is also making a comeback to direction with a big bang and has some big Pan India Projects lined up.

References

Living people
Kannada-language writers
1977 births
People from Chikkamagaluru district